Kingsley-Collins Ezenna Keke (born September 26, 1996) is an American football defensive tackle who is a free agent. He played college football at Texas A&M, and was selected by the Green Bay Packers in the fifth round of the 2019 NFL Draft.

High school career
Kingsley Keke played football and basketball at George Ranch High School in Richmond, Texas. As a senior, Keke made sixty tackles, ten tackles for loss, five sacks, blocked a pair of kicks, and was a finalist for the Greater Houston Rotary Lombardi Award.

College career

Keke played at Texas A&M from 2015 to 2018. In his career at Texas A&M, he recorded one hundred fifty total tackles, twenty-one tackles for loss, and twelve sacks.

Professional career

Green Bay Packers
Keke was drafted by the Green Bay Packers in the fifth round, 150th overall, in the 2019 NFL Draft. On May 3, 2019, he signed his rookie contract with the Packers.

In Week 3 of the 2020 season against the New Orleans Saints, Keke recorded his first two career sacks on Drew Brees during the 37–30 win. In Week 13 against the Philadelphia Eagles, he sacked Carson Wentz twice and had four total tackles (two for loss) during the 30–16 win.

On January 19, 2022, Keke was released by the Packers. He was claimed the following day by the Houston Texans

Houston Texans
On January 20, 2022, Keke was claimed off waivers by the Houston Texans. He was waived on May 3, 2022.

Arizona Cardinals
On May 13, 2022, Keke signed with the Arizona Cardinals. He was released on August 14, 2022.

NFL career statistics

Regular season

Postseason

Personal life
Keke spent a year in Nigeria during his childhood.

References

External links
Arizona Cardinals bio
Texas A&M Aggies bio

1996 births
Living people
People from Richmond, Texas
Players of American football from Texas
Sportspeople from the Houston metropolitan area
American football defensive tackles
Texas A&M Aggies football players
Green Bay Packers players
Houston Texans players
Arizona Cardinals players